Petrus de Dacia (ca. 1235 - 1289) was a 13th-century  Swedish friar of the Dominican Order. 
He was most noted for his correspondence with the mystic and ecstatic Christina von Stommeln. Though he wrote in Latin, Petrus de Dacia is often credited as the first author in Sweden.

Biography
Peter of Dacia was born around 1235 on the Swedish island of Gotland. He entered the Dominican order   and studied in Cologne from 1266 to 1269 and in Paris from 1269 to 1270.
In 1271 he was appointed lector in the convent at Skänninge in Östergötland.  in 1283 he was became Prior of Sankt Nicolaus abbey church  in Gotland where he died in 1288. 

While at Cologne, he had met   Christina von Stommeln (1242-1312). Christina lived around Stommeln near Cologne  and had entered the convent of the Beguines at Cologne. Over a period of two decades, she reportedly received stigmata on an annual basis.  Peter visited Christine in 1270 on his way back from Paris and again in 1279. He also maintained a lifetime  correspondence with her.

References

Other sources

Sebastian Sobecki (2006). "Peter of Dacia". In Geary, Patrick, Lexikon des Mittelalters/International Encyclopaedia for the Middle Ages. 

 Petrus de Dacia, Om den saliga jungfrun Kristina av Stommeln trans. by Tryggve Lundén (Stockholm: Albert Bonniers Förlag. 1950),

Swedish male writers
Swedish Dominicans
Christian hagiographers
1289 deaths
Year of birth unknown
13th-century Swedish people
People from Gotland
Year of birth uncertain